"I'm All Over It" is the first single from The Pursuit, the fifth studio album by Jamie Cullum. It was released on 2 November 2009 and entered the UK top 75 at No. 55, up from No. 92 the week before.

Cullum explained: "I'd split up with someone and met the love of my life so this is a break-up song about feeling heartbroken then having that moment where the switch flips and you realise you're fine. It's an example of me writing lyrics that appear to make sense but don't necessarily when you try and pick them apart. It's the snappiest, poppiest song I've ever done and it was written in 90 minutes."

The song is also featured in the "Argument" advert for Vodafone (2010)

Track listing
 "I'm All Over It (Album version)" – 3:40
 "So They Say" – 4:54
 "I'm All Over It" (video clip) – 3:45 (iTunes Music Store release.)

References

2009 songs
2009 singles
Jamie Cullum songs
Songs written by Ricky Ross (musician)
Song recordings produced by Greg Wells